Paul Beamish is a Canadian social scientist, currently a Canada Research Chair at University of Western Ontario.

References

Year of birth missing (living people)
Living people
Academic staff of the University of Western Ontario
Canadian social scientists
Fellows of the Royal Society of Canada
University of Western Ontario alumni